Thoughts Become Things is the sixth and final studio album by American rapper Skillz. It was released on December 24, 2012. The album features guest appearances from Joe Tann, Cam Wallace, E. Penn, Carmael, Planet 6 and Ayah.

Track listing

References

Skillz albums
2012 albums